Jerick Johnson (born January 31, 1980) is an American professional stock car racing driver. He has made starts in the NASCAR Xfinity Series, Truck Series, ARCA Menards Series, and the East and West Series. He competed in all of these series between 2003 and 2011.

Racing career
Johnson did not race in NASCAR or ARCA in 2009, instead competing in the ASA, where he won rookie of the year. In 2010, he and his No. 76 team returned to racing stock cars and announced they would compete in ten ARCA races with sponsorship from the American Legion and David Law Firm. This was Johnson's first time running ARCA since 2006. They ended up expanding their schedule to 14 races, and finished 18th in points with one top-ten finish which came at Toledo. Johnson was the highest-finishing part-time driver in the standings in 2010, excluding Steve Arpin (who had to miss two ARCA races to drive for JR Motorsports in the Nationwide Series), Chad McCumbee (who started the season late in his full-time ride), and Rob Jones (who skipped the Daytona season-opener only).

Personal life
In many races during his NASCAR and ARCA career, Johnson's sponsor was the American Legion, which gave Johnson's the nickname of "the freedom car."

Motorsports career results

NASCAR
(key) (Bold – Pole position awarded by qualifying time. Italics – Pole position earned by points standings or practice time. * – Most laps led.)

Nationwide Series

Camping World Truck Series

K&N Pro Series East

West Series

ARCA Racing Series
(key) (Bold – Pole position awarded by qualifying time. Italics – Pole position earned by points standings or practice time. * – Most laps led.)

References

External links
 
 

1980 births
Living people
People from Faribault, Minnesota
Racing drivers from Minnesota
NASCAR drivers
ARCA Menards Series drivers
CARS Tour drivers
American Speed Association drivers
ARCA Midwest Tour drivers